Algeria competed at the 2012 Summer Olympics in London, United Kingdom, from 27 July to 12 August 2012. This was the nation's twelfth consecutive appearance at the Summer Olympics, except for the 1976 Summer Olympics in Montreal because of the African boycott.

The Algerian Olympic Committee sent a total of 39 athletes to the Games, 21 men and 18 women, to compete in 12 sports. Women's volleyball was the only team event in which Algeria had its representation in these Olympic Games. There was only a single competitor in road cycling, rowing, sailing, shooting, swimming, and weightlifting. Boxing was the largest team by an individual-based sport, with a total of eight competitors.

The Algerian team included judoka Soraya Haddad, who previously won the bronze medal in Beijing, and sabre fencer Lea Moutoussamy, who set the nation's record as the youngest athlete, at age 14, in its Olympic history. Light heavyweight boxer and 2011 World Series champion Abdelhafid Benchabla was the nation's flag bearer at the opening ceremony.

Algeria left London with its first Olympic gold medal since 2000 from middle-distance runner Taoufik Makhloufi.

Medalists

| width="100%" align="left" valign="top" |

| width="30%" align="left" valign="top" |

Competitors

Athletics

Algerian athletes have achieved qualifying standards in the following athletics events (up to a maximum of 3 athletes in each event at the 'A' Standard, and 1 at the 'B' Standard):

Key
 Note – Ranks given for track events are within the athlete's heat only
 Q = Qualified for the next round
 q = Qualified for the next round as a fastest loser or, in field events, by position without achieving the qualifying target
 NR = National record
 N/A = Round not applicable for the event
 Bye = Athlete not required to compete in round

Men
Track & road events

Field events

Women
Track & road events

Boxing

Algeria has qualified 2 boxers.  Abdelhafid Benchabla has qualified for the Games by winning the light heavyweight 80–85 kg division at the World Series of Boxing finals. Mohamed Amine Ouadahi qualified from the 2011 World Amateur Boxing Championships. Algeria also qualified boxers from the African Continental Tournament.

Men

Cycling

Road
Algeria has qualified one rider.

Fencing

Algeria has qualified 2 fencers.

Women

Judo

Rowing

Algeria has qualified the following boat.

Women

Qualification Legend: FA=Final A (medal); FB=Final B (non-medal); FC=Final C (non-medal); FD=Final D (non-medal); FE=Final E (non-medal); FF=Final F (non-medal); SA/B=Semifinals A/B; SC/D=Semifinals C/D; SE/F=Semifinals E/F; QF=Quarterfinals; R=Repechage

Shooting

Men

Swimming

Algerian swimmers have achieved qualifying standards in the following events (up to a maximum of 2 swimmers in each event at the Olympic Qualifying Time (OQT), and 1 at the Olympic Selection Time (OST)):

Men

Taekwondo

Algeria has qualified 1 athlete.

Volleyball

Algeria's women's team qualified for the indoor tournament.
 Women's team event – 1 team of 12 players

Women's indoor tournament

Team roster

Group play

Weightlifting

Algeria has qualified the following quota places.

Wrestling

Algeria has qualified three quota places.

Key:
  – Victory by Fall.
  – Decision by Points – the loser with technical points.
  – Decision by Points – the loser without technical points.

Men's freestyle

Men's Greco-Roman

See also
 Algeria at the 2012 Summer Paralympics

References

External links

 
 

Nations at the 2012 Summer Olympics
2012
Olympics